Professor Robin Pollard is a New Zealand academic who has spent much of his career working in Australia and Malaysia. He was the Vice-Chancellor at Lincoln University (New Zealand) near his home town of Christchurch, New Zealand until March 2018. Previous positions include Deputy Vice-Chancellor at Central Lancashire University and Pro Vice-Chancellor and President of Monash University Malaysia Campus.

Professor Pollard's background is in condense matter physics, although he has also held academic posts in information technology, marketing and chemistry. He has taught at universities in Australia, Malaysia, New Zealand, Canada, the United States of America and the United Kingdom.

He was part of the first cohort of professors to teach at Monash Malaysia upon its formal opening in 1998, serving as the Foundation Professor and Head of the School of Business and Information Technology.

References

Australian physicists
Living people
Academic staff of the Lincoln University (New Zealand)
People from Christchurch
Year of birth missing (living people)
Academic staff of Monash University